Yokoo is a surname. Notable people with the surname include:

Kazuko Yokoo (born 1941), Japanese diplomat
Kazunori Yokoo, Japanese actor
Kaname Yokoo (born 1972), Japanese golfer
Tadanori Yokoo (born 1936), Japanese graphic designer
Yoko Taro (born 1970), Japanese video game director